Mitsuru Takada (born 26 September 1969) is a former Japanese tennis player.

Takada has a career high ATP singles ranking of 706 achieved on 7 June 1999. He also has a career high ATP doubles ranking of 245 achieved on 27 July 1998.

Takada made his ATP main draw debut at the 1994 Tokyo Indoor in the doubles main draw.

He is now the current coach of Japanese tennis player Yoshihito Nishioka.

External links

1969 births
Living people
Japanese male tennis players
Sportspeople from Okinawa Prefecture
People from Kawasaki, Kanagawa